Cyclaxyra jelineki is a species of cucujoid beetle in the family Cyclaxyridae. It is endemic to New Zealand, found on the North Island, South Island, and Stewart Island.

References

Cucujoidea